The Men's individual event of the Biathlon World Championships 2016 was held on 10 March 2016.

Results
The race was started at 15:30 CET.

References

Men's individual